Surya Sakkhi (English: The Sun is The Witness) is a 1981 Indian Bengali-language romantic drama film directed by Agradoot. This film was released under the banner of Manjir Films.

Plot
A budding singer's marriage with his childhood sweetheart is in shambles after his ex-girlfriend from college comes back into his life.

Cast
 Uttam Kumar
 Chhaya Devi
 Kamal Mitra
 Mahua Roy Chowdhury
 Biplab Chatterjee
 Shakuntala Barua
 Asit Baran
 Gita Dey
 Mrinal Mukherjee
 Mantu Banerjee
 Dilip Bose
 Haripada Sengupta
 Bappaditya Roy

References

External links
 

1981 films
1981 drama films
Indian drama films
1980s Bengali-language films
Films directed by Agradoot
Bengali-language Indian films